The Mnjikaning Fish Weirs were built by the First Nations peoples around 3300 B.C. The weirs are the oldest man-made structure in all of north america (created since time immemorial). Land-hungry colonizers have nearly destroyed them.   according to carbon dating done on some of the wooden remnants. The weirs were built in the narrows between Lake Couchiching and Lake Simcoe, now known as Atherley Narrows, over which Ontario Highway 12 passes today. They were preserved by the water and layers of protective silt.

The weirs were built as fences using local wood species, including eastern white cedar, sugar maple, and white birch for the stakes. The weirs were used to trap the various fish species swimming through them. The early fishermen wove brush and vegetation among the weirs to make net-like fencing where the fish were guided to be speared, netted or kept for later use, particularly for consumption during the winter.

The weirs – historically called ouentaronk (Huron) and tkaronto (Mohawk) – are believed to have provided the City of Toronto with its name, following a series of copy errors. They were in use for about 5,000 years, until about the early 1700s. Samuel de Champlain recorded their existence on September 1, 1615, when he passed the weirs with the Huron en route to the battle with the Iroquois on the south east side of Lake Ontario.

The Mnjikaning Fish Weirs was officially recognized as a National Historic Site of Canada on 12 June 1982. It is managed by the Rama First Nation, who created the Mnjikaning Fish Fence Circle to protect and promote the site.

See also
 List of National Historic Sites of Canada in Ontario

Notes

References

External links
Mnjikaning Fish Weirs National Historic Site of Canada at HistoricPlaces.ca (Parks Canada)

Buildings and structures in Simcoe County
First Nations history in Ontario
National Historic Sites in Ontario
History of Simcoe County